Willie Oshodin (born September 16, 1969) is a former American football defensive end. He played for the Denver Broncos from 1993 to 1995.

References

1969 births
Living people
American football defensive ends
Villanova Wildcats football players
Denver Broncos players